FRANK is a national anti-drug advisory service jointly established by the Department of Health and Home Office of the British government in 2003. It is intended to reduce the use of both legal and illegal drugs by educating teenagers and adolescents about the potential effects of drugs. It has run many media campaigns on television, radio and the internet.

Services 
FRANK provides the following services for people who seek information and/or advice about drugs:
 A website
 A confidential telephone number, available 24 hours a day
 Email
 A confidential live chat service, available from 2pm-6pm daily
 A service to locate counselling and treatment

Campaigns 

Talk To Frank, along with RSA Films produced a short film in 2007 entitled "Brain Warehouse". The film, directed by Ronnie West, follows 10 teenage boys and girls who are using different drugs and explores the positives and negative aspects of recreational drug use.

The most well-known Frank advertisements are focused on Pablo, a small dog used as a mule to smuggle cocaine into the United Kingdom. Voiced by David Mitchell, the 6 adverts follow Pablo as he attempts to learn about cocaine and why people choose to use it. The adverts received much praise from the media and general public.

Criticism 

In 2007, FRANK removed a website article titled "Cannabis Explained" after several groups pointed out errors in the information presented.

The Conservative MP Iain Duncan Smith criticised FRANK and drug education more generally in a February 2010 speech, arguing that "Drugs education programmes, such as Talk to FRANK, have failed on prevention and intervention, instead progressively focussing on harm reduction and risk minimisation, which can be counter-productive." The Centre for Social Justice, a right-wing think tank set up by Duncan Smith, further argued in a December 2010 paper that FRANK "has proved ineffectual and even damaging, to the point of giving information as to the ‘cost’ and immediate physical effects of drugs more prominently than driving home the danger."

References

Notes

External links 
 
 
 

Drug policy of the United Kingdom
Health campaigns
Department of Health and Social Care
Home Office (United Kingdom)
2003 establishments in the United Kingdom